William Ross Logan (24 November 1909 – 26 October 1993) was a Scottish international rugby union and cricket player.

Rugby Union career

Amateur career

He attended Merchiston Castle School, where he captained the school team for three successive seasons. He also played for Edinburgh University RFC, and Edinburgh Wanderers, captaining the latter at one point.

Provincial career

He was capped by Edinburgh District for the 1931 inter-city match.

Ross turned out for the Scotland Probables side for the second and final trial match of the 1937-38 season, on 15 January 1938.

International career

He was only capped once in 1931 whilst still a student playing for Edinburgh University, in the game against .

(Scotland won 13–6)

One contemporary description of Logan says "[he] plays a characteristic hard game and is a past master in both defence and attack."

Administrative career

He became the 76th President of the Scottish Rugby Union. He served the standard one year from 1964 to 1965.

Cricket career

He also played for the Scotland national cricket team.

See also
 List of Scottish cricket and rugby union players

References

Sources

 Bath, Richard (ed.) The Scotland Rugby Miscellany (Vision Sports Publishing Ltd, 2007 )
 Massie, Allan A Portrait of Scottish Rugby (Polygon, Edinburgh)
 Starmer-Smith, Nigel (ed) Rugby - A Way of Life, An Illustrated History of Rugby (Lennard Books, 1986 )

1909 births
1993 deaths
Scottish rugby union players
Scotland international rugby union players
Scottish cricketers
People educated at Merchiston Castle School
Edinburgh University RFC players
Edinburgh Wanderers RFC players
Alumni of the University of Edinburgh
Cricketers from Edinburgh
Rugby union players from Edinburgh
Presidents of the Scottish Rugby Union
Edinburgh District (rugby union) players
Scotland Probables players
Wicket-keepers
Rugby union scrum-halves